Antal Németh (born 1 March 1974) is a Hungarian professional football coach who last managed Fortuna Liga club DAC 1904 Dunajská Streda.

Personal life
Németh is married to his wife Stella.

References

External links
 FC DAC 1904 Dunajská Streda official club profile

1974 births
Living people
Sportspeople from Budapest
Hungarian football managers
FC DAC 1904 Dunajská Streda managers
Slovak Super Liga managers
Hungarian expatriate football managers
Hungarian expatriate sportspeople in Slovakia
Expatriate football managers in Slovakia